Noire River or Rivière Noire may refer to:

North America
 Grande rivière Noire or Big Black River (Saint John River tributary), in Maine, United States, and Quebec, Canada
 Noire River (L'Assomption River tributary), Matawinie, Lanaudière, Quebec, Canada
 Noire River (Ottawa River tributary), Waltham, Quebec, Canada
 Noire River (Beaurivage River tributary), Quebec, Canada
 Noire River (Bécancour River tributary), L'Érable, Centre-du-Québec, Quebec, Canada
 Noire River (Bulstrode River tributary), Arthabaska, Centre-du-Québec, Quebec, Canada
 Noire River (Felton River tributary), Le Granit, Estrie, Quebec, Canada
 Noire River (Fourche River tributary), Les Chenaux Regional County Municipality, Mauricie, Quebec, Canada
 Noire River (Huron River tributary), Lotbinière, Chaudière-Appalaches, Québec, Canada
 Noire River (rivière du Moulin tributary), Robert-Cliche, Chaudière-Appalaches, Quebec, Canada
 Noire River (Yamaska River tributary), Estrie and Montérégie, Quebec, Canada
 Little Black River (Saint John River tributary), flowing in Quebec (Canada) and Maine (USA)
 Noire River (Charlevoix), a tributary of the Saint Lawrence River in Quebec, Canada
 Noire River (Shawinigan), a tributary of the Saint-Maurice River in Shawinigan, Quebec, Canada
 Noire River (English River tributary), Haut-Saint-Laurent, Montérégie, Quebec, Canada
 Noire River (rivière de l'Esturgeon), Roussillon, Montérégie, Quebec, Canada
 Rivière Noire du Milieu, Mont-Élie, Charlevoix-Est, Capitale-Nationale, Quebec, Canada
 Rivière Noire Sud-Ouest, Monté-Élie, Charlevoix-Est, Capitale-Nationale, Quebec, Canada
 Noire River (rivière des Hurons),  Stoneham-et-Tewkesbury, La Jacques-Cartier, Capitale-Nationale, Quebec, Canada
 Noire River (rivière aux Pommes), Portneuf RCM, Quebec, Canada
 Noire River (Montmorency River tributary), La Côte-de-Beaupré, Capitale-Nationale, Quebec, Canada

 Noire River (Prévost-Gilbert River tributary), Chaudière-Appalaches, Quebec, Canada
 Noire River (Sainte-Anne River), sub-basin of the Sainte-Anne river in Portneuf RCM, Quebec, Canada
 Rivière Noire or Little Black River (Saint John River tributary), in Quebec, Canada, and northern Maine, United States
 Rivière Noire du Milieu (Black River of the Middle), a tributary of the Noire River flowing in Mont-Élie in Charlevoix-Est Regional County Municipality, in Quebec
 Rivière Noire Sud-Ouest (Black River Southwest), a tributary of the Noire River flowing in Mont-Élie in Charlevoix-Est Regional County Municipality, in Quebec
 Noire River (Montmorency River), a tributary of the Montmorency River in Capitale-Nationale, Quebec, Canada

Belgium
 Eau Noire river, tributary of the Meuse where Neptune Caves are located

See also
 List of rivers of Quebec, including several called Noire River or Rivière Noire
 Black River (disambiguation)